Apechthes is a genus of longhorn beetles of the subfamily Lamiinae.

 Apechtes championi Bates, 1881
 Apechtes mexicanus Thomson, 1860

References

Colobotheini